A Man Alone (fully titled A Man Alone: The Words and Music of McKuen) is a 1969 studio album by American singer Frank Sinatra, arranged by Don Costa.

In a tribute to the poet, all songs on this album were written by Rod McKuen. "Love's Been Good to Me" reached No. 8 on the British charts, and was also notably recorded by Johnny Cash.

Track listing
All songs written by Rod McKuen

"A Man Alone" – 3:47
"Night" (Spoken) – 2:25
"I've Been to Town" – 3:13
"From Promise to Promise" (Spoken) – 1:31
"The Single Man" – 3:01
"The Beautiful Strangers" – 2:41
"Lonesome Cities" – 3:18
"Love's Been Good to Me" – 3:27
"Empty Is" (Spoken) – 2:46
"Out Beyond the Window" (Spoken) – 2:45
"Some Traveling Music" (Spoken) – 2:36
"A Man Alone (Reprise)" – 1:30

Complete Personnel
 Frank Sinatra – Vocals
 Don Costa – Arranger, Conductor

Tracks 1, 6, 8, 12:

(March 20, 1969 – Reprise recording session – Western Recorders 8–11 PM)

John Cave, James Decker, James McGee, Arthur Maebe (fr-h); Gene Cipriano, Norman Herzberg, Bill Hood, Ronny Lang, Don Lodice, Ted Nash, Bud Shank, Nino Tempo (sax/wwd); Thelma Beach, Arnold Belnick, James Getzoff, William Kurasch, Emo Neufeld, Lou Raderman, Sally Raderman, Mischa Russell, Ralph Schaeffer, Marshall Sosson, Gerald Vinci, Tibor Zelig (vln); Alvin Dinkin, Alex Neiman, Allan Harshman, Paul Robyn (via); Justin DiTullio, Armand Kaproff, Ray Kramer, Jacqueline Lustgarten (vie); Kathryn Julye (harp); Bill Miller (p); Al Viola (g); Chuck Berghofer, Eddie Gilbert (b); Alvin Stoller (d); Larry Bunker (perc).

Tracks 2, 4, 10, 11:

(March 21, 1969 – Reprise recording session – Western Recorders 8–11 PM)

John Cave, Vincent DeRosa, William Hinshaw, Richard Perissi (fr-h); Gene Cipriano, Norman Herzberg, Bill Hood, Ronny Lang, Don Lodice, Ted Nash, Bud Shank, Nino Tempo (sax/wwd); Thelma Beach, Arnold Belnick, James Getzoff, William Kurasch, Emo Neufeld, Lou Raderman, Sally Raderman, Mischa Russell, Ralph Schaeffer, Marshall Sosson, Gerald Vinci, Tibor Zelig (vln); Alvin Dinkin, Alex Neiman, Allan Harshman, Paul Robyn (via); Justin DiTullio, Armand Kaproff, Edgar Lustgarten, Nino Rosso (vlc); Kathryn Julye (harp); Bill Miller (p); Al Viola (g); Chuck Berghofer, Eddie Gilbert (b); Alvin Stoller (d); Emil Richards (perc).

Tracks 3, 5, 7, 9:

(March 19, 1969 – Reprise recording session – Western Recorders 8–11 PM)

John Cave, Vincent DeRosa, William Hinshaw, Richard Perissi (fr-h); Gene Cipriano, Chuck Gentry, Norman Herzberg, Ronny Lang, Don Lodice, Ted Nash, Bud Shank, Nino Tempo (sax/wwd); Israel Baker, Thelma Beach, Bonnie Douglas, Jacques Gasselin, Emo Neufeld, Lou Raderman, Sally Raderman, Nathan Ross, Mischa Russell, Paul Shure, Marshall Sasson, Gerald Vinci (vln); Alvin Dinkin, Alex Neiman, Allan Harshman, Paul Robyn (via); Justin DiTullio, Edgar Lustgarten, Kurt Reher, Nino Rosso (vlc); Kathryn Julye (harp); Bill Miller (p); Al Viola (g); Chuck Berghofer, Eddie Gilbert (b); Irving Cottler (d); Larry Bunker (perc); Nancy Adams, Tom Bahler, Betty Baker, James Bryant, Jan Gassman, Bill Lee, Diana Lee, Susan Tallman, Marie Vernon, Jerry Whitman (voc)

References

Frank Sinatra albums
Albums arranged by Don Costa
Reprise Records albums
1969 albums
Albums produced by Sonny Burke
Albums conducted by Don Costa
Works by Rod McKuen